Sergei Prokofiev's Quintet in G minor, Op. 39 is a piece of chamber music for oboe, clarinet, violin, viola and double bass, written in 1924. The quintet, closely related to Prokofiev's ballet, Trapèze, contains six movements and lasts 20–25 minutes.

Background
In 1924, when Prokofiev was staying in Paris, a travelling troupe commissioned a chamber ballet from him. However, the ensemble that provided music accompaniment to the troupe only contained five members. This provided Prokofiev an opportunity to write more chamber music. His most recent chamber piece had been the Overture on Hebrew Themes, Op. 34 (1919).

Later, Prokofiev incorporated the ballet music into two pieces: Quintet, Op. 39 (1924) and Divertissement Op. 43 (1925–29).

Movements
Tema con variazioni
Andante energico
Allegro sostenuto, ma con brio
Adagio pesante
Allegro precipitato, ma non troppo presto
Andantino

The related ballet, Trapèze, reconstructed in 2002, is in five movements:
Overture
Moderato, molto ritmato
"Matelote"
Allegro
"The Ballerina"
Tema con variazioni
Andante energico
"Dance of the Tumblers"
Allegro sostenuto, ma con brio
Adagio pesante
Allegro precipitato, ma non troppo presto
"Mourning the Ballerina"
Andantino

Companion pieces
Nicholas Urie, Quintet, 2017, Commissioned by the Boston Symphony Orchestra. Nicholas Urie, Quintet.

See also
Prokofiev – Chamber Music
Prokofiev – List of Compositions

References

External links

Prokofiev Quintet in G minor, Opus 39 (1924).
Video – Prokofiev Quintet in G minor – Complete (22:49).
Video – Prokofiev Quintet in G minor – Part 1 (05:57). 
Video – Prokofiev Quintet in G minor – Part 2 (02:43). 
Video – Prokofiev Quintet in G minor – Part 3 (02:36). 
Video – Prokofiev Quintet in G minor – Part 4 (03:49). 
Video – Prokofiev Quintet in G minor – Part 5 (08:13).

Chamber music by Sergei Prokofiev
Prokofiev
20th-century classical music
1923 compositions
Compositions in G minor